Čelůstka is a Czech surname. Notable people with the surname include:

Jan Čelůstka (born 1982), Czech triathlete
Ondřej Čelůstka (born 1989), Czech footballer

Czech-language surnames